The Northwest Ranger was a Canadian bush aircraft that was under development by Northwest Industries (NWI) of Edmonton, Alberta between 1968-1972. The aircraft was a type certified design, and intended to be supplied as a complete ready-to-fly-aircraft.

Design and development
The Ranger was a development of the Aermacchi AL-60, which itself was based upon the Lockheed Model 60. NWI established its reputation as an aircraft overhauler and maintenance facility, but decided to enter the aircraft manufacturing business by buying the rights to the AL-60 in 1968.

The aircraft featured a strut-braced high-wing, a six to eight seat enclosed cabin and optional fixed tricycle landing gear, conventional landing gear, floats or skis and a single engine in tractor configuration. The Ranger differed from the AL-60 in having main landing gear leg fairings and Hoerner wing tips.

The Ranger's wing employed large flaps. Approved floats were Edo Aircraft Corporation models and both straight skis and Genaire Limited Canada Fluidyne Engineering wheel skis could also be fitted. Cabin access was through the small left front pilot door or a large cabin passenger and freight door.

The initial version proposed used the  Lycoming IO-720 A1A engine, but this did not provide adequate float performance and in 1970 was replaced by a  Lycoming IO-720 B1A powerplant and the version termed the Ranger C-6 to distinguish it from the last production Aermacchi AL-60C-5 model.

The initial version was prototyped in 1968 but a long period of performance and user trials followed which resulted in design changes and the improved C-6 model, prior to production commencing. Development had ended by 1972, but it is not clear how many were completed, although at least four bore Canadian registration at one time. The fate of the NWI prototype CF-XED is not known and it is likely that no Rangers exist today. As of September 2013 none remain registered with Transport Canada or with the Federal Aviation Administration in the United States.

Variants
Ranger
Initial proposed version with  Lycoming IO-720 A1A engine. Generally similar to the Italian Aermacchi AL-60C-5 model.
Ranger C-6
Improved proposed version with an upgraded  Lycoming IO-720 B1A engine.

Specifications (Ranger)

References

External links
Photo of the Ranger production line
Photo of the Ranger prototype

Single-engined tractor aircraft